Chuah Hean Teik  PSM, DSPN is a Malaysian eminent scholar, researcher, academic and industry leader.

He has been the President and CEO of Universiti Tunku Abdul Rahman (UTAR), Malaysia from April 2008 until September 2019. He is currently the President of the Federation of Engineering Institutions of Asia and the Pacific (FEIAP) and strongly advocates mutual recognition of engineering degrees in Asia and the Pacific region by promoting the FEIAP Engineering Education guidelines.

He was named Fellow of the Institute of Electrical and Electronics Engineers (IEEE) in 2014 for leadership in engineering education.

He is also a Consultant Professor to Northwestern Polytechnical University since 2018 and University Advisor for University of Sanya since 2020.

Honours 
  :
  Commander of the Order of Loyalty to the Crown of Malaysia (PSM) - Tan Sri (2019)
  :
  Officer of the Order of the Defender of State (DSPN) - Dato'

Other Awards 
 Balai Ikhtisas Malaysia (BIM) Lifetime Achievement Award

History 
On 10 April 2008, Universiti Tunku Abdul Rahman (UTAR) Council Chairman Ling Liong Sik has appointed him as its new President cum CEO to succeed Ng Lay Swee from 1 April 2008 onwards.

References

External links
 Official UTAR Page of Chuah Hean Teik

Living people
People from Penang
Malaysian people of Hokkien descent
Malaysian people of Chinese descent
Commanders of the Order of Loyalty to the Crown of Malaysia
Malaysian electrical engineers
Fellow Members of the IEEE
University of Malaya alumni
1961 births